Anti Poolamets (born 22 February 1971 in Tallinn) is an Estonian historian, lawyer and politician. He has been member of XIV Riigikogu.

In 2000 he graduated from the University of Tartu with a degree in law, and in 2010 with a degree in history. From 2001 to 2014 he was a lecturer at Estonian Academy of Security Sciences.

Since 2014 he is a member of Estonian Conservative People's Party.

References

1971 births
21st-century Estonian historians
21st-century Estonian lawyers
Conservative People's Party of Estonia politicians
Estonian Greens politicians
Estonian Independence Party politicians
Estonian male writers
Living people
Members of the Riigikogu, 2019–2023
Members of the Riigikogu, 2023–2027
Politicians from Tallinn
University of Tartu alumni
Writers from Tallinn